A referendum on introducing state television was held in Norfolk Island on 21 May 1986. The referendum was a citizen-initiated vote. Voters were asked "Would television as proposed by the Norfolk Island Government be good for Norfolk Island?" The proposal was approved by 50.3% of voters, with the "yes" option receiving just 13 more votes than "no". Following the referendum, legislation to fund the television service was approved by the Norfolk Island Legislative Assembly.

Results

References

Norfolk Island
Referendums in Norfolk Island
Election and referendum articles with incomplete results